Brooke Louise Hanson, OAM (born 18 March 1978) is an Australian former competitive swimmer, Olympic gold medallist, world champion, and former world record-holder.

Career
A swimmer since the age of four, Hanson was the youngest swimmer on the Australian national team at the 1994 Commonwealth Games, where she finished fourth in the 200-metre breaststroke. However, she would not qualify for another major international competition for eight years, until she qualified for the 100- and 200-metre breaststroke at the 2002 Commonwealth Games. At the 2003 World Aquatics Championships, she would finish second in the 50-metre breaststroke and sixth in the 100-metre breaststroke.

At the 2004 Summer Olympics, Hanson won a gold medal as part of the Australian 4×100-metre medley relay team by swimming the breaststroke leg in a preliminary heat (Leisel Jones swam the breaststroke leg in the final). Jones' selection was the source of much discussion, and rumours spread of conflict between the two. She also won silver in the 100-metre breaststroke, finishing 0.01s ahead of Jones.

Several weeks later, Hanson competed at the 2004 FINA Short Course World Championships in Indianapolis, Indiana. Most of the medal-winners from the recently finished Olympics chose not to attend which allowed Hanson to win six gold medals, five of which were for individual events.

2005 was a difficult year for Hanson. She was defeated by both Jade Edmistone and Leisel Jones in the 50- and 100-metre breaststroke at the Australian Championships. At the 2005 World Aquatics Championships in Montreal, Hanson missed the medals in both the 100-metre breaststroke and the 200-metre individual medley, but claimed bronze in the 50-metre breaststroke.

She admitted after the 2006 Commonwealth Games trials that she had been close to retiring. She missed qualification for the 50- and 100-metre breaststroke events, where the three positions were claimed by Jones, Edmistone and Tarnee White respectively. She qualified for the 200 m breaststroke and individual medley, and claimed silver in the latter event behind young teammate Stephanie Rice.

She swims with the Nunawading Swimming Club in Melbourne.

In 2006, she joined the health and lifestyle program What's Good For You team and is a presenter in the second series of the show. At the 2007 Logies, she was nominated for Most Popular Female New Talent for her role in the show.

On 17 June 2007, Hanson was taken to hospital after collapsing after an apparent electric shock after climbing out of a spa at a pool and spa show in Melbourne. An investigation by Energy Safe Victoria found no fault with the spa.

In 2008, she auditioned unsuccessfully for Gladiators on the Seven Network.

Hanson's father is a public relations specialist with Swimming Australia and runs Hanson Sports Media an Australian sports media company.

Hanson is married to Jared Clarke and they have three children.  In July 2011, Hanson gave birth prematurely to a son, who she and Clarke named Jack. On 3 April 2012, Jack died from a cardiac arrest. He had suffered from a chronic lung disease and pulmonary hypertension.

See also 
 List of Olympic medalists in swimming (women)
 List of World Aquatics Championships medalists in swimming (women)
 List of Commonwealth Games medallists in swimming (women)
 World record progression 4 × 100 metres medley relay

References

External links 
 The Official Site of Brooke Hanson
 The Nunawading Swimming Club
 Jones and Hanson selection incident
 

1978 births
Living people
Sportswomen from New South Wales
Olympic swimmers of Australia
Swimmers at the 2004 Summer Olympics
Olympic gold medalists for Australia
Olympic silver medalists for Australia
Recipients of the Medal of the Order of Australia
Commonwealth Games silver medallists for Australia
World record setters in swimming
Australian female medley swimmers
Australian female backstroke swimmers
World Aquatics Championships medalists in swimming
Medalists at the FINA World Swimming Championships (25 m)
Medalists at the 2004 Summer Olympics
Swimmers from Sydney
Olympic gold medalists in swimming
Olympic silver medalists in swimming
Commonwealth Games medallists in swimming
Universiade medalists in swimming
Swimmers at the 2002 Commonwealth Games
Swimmers at the 2006 Commonwealth Games
Universiade silver medalists for Australia
Universiade bronze medalists for Australia
Medalists at the 1999 Summer Universiade
Medallists at the 2002 Commonwealth Games
Medallists at the 2006 Commonwealth Games